Amaranthus greggii, also known as Gregg's amaranth or Josiah amaranth, is a glabrous annual flowering plant native to Texas, Louisiana, and Mexico.  The plant can grow up to 1 m (3 ft) in height.  It is found in sand dunes and near sea beaches.  The species name greggii honors Josiah Gregg (1806–1850), a merchant, explorer, naturalist, and author of the American Southwest and Northern Mexico.

References

greggii
Flora of Louisiana
Flora of Texas
Flora of Mexico
Taxa named by Sereno Watson

According to J. D. Sauer (1972b), Amaranthus myrianthus Standley most probably is a hybrid between A. arenicola and A. greggii. The seeds of A.greggii are dark brown and shiny, with 1.2-1.7 mm in diameter.